This is a list of female sports athletes who have been inducted into the International Women's Sports Hall of Fame, which recognizes the athletic and coaching achievements of women.  Selections are made worldwide and are based on achievements, breakthroughs, innovative style and ongoing commitment to the development of women’s sports. Sports organizations, sports historians and the public may nominate potential candidates and The Hall of Fame Selection Committee votes to select inductees. Since its inception in 1980 under the auspices of the Women's Sports Foundation, a total of 113 athletes and 21 coaches have been inducted. The United States is represented by 94 (70%) of the 134 inductees.

The International Women's Sports Hall of Fame was initially located in East Meadow, New York. In May 2008, its archives were placed in the Sports Museum of America in lower Manhattan. After the Sports Museum of America closed in February 2009, less than nine months later, the women's archives were placed in storage.

Members of the International Hall of Fame

Aviation
 Bessie Coleman 1992 
Amelia Earhart 1980 
Marie Marvingt (and mountaineering) 1987

Badminton
 Judy Devlin Hashman 1995

Baseball
 Toni Stone 1993

Basketball
 Jody Conradt (Coach Category) 1995 
 Lusia Harris 2005 
Ann Meyers 1985 
 Cheryl Miller 1991 
 C. Vivian Stringer (Coach Category) 2006 
Pat Summitt (Coach Category) 1990 
 Tara VanDerveer (Coach Category) 1998 
 Margaret Wade (Coach Category) 1992

Bowling
Marion Ladewig 1984

Cycling
Connie Carpenter-Phinney 1990

Diving
 Min Gao 2003 
Pat McCormick 1984 
Micki King 1983 
Aileen Riggin Soule 1988

Equestrian
 Liz Hartel 1994

Fencing
Ilona Schacherer-Elek 1989 
 Nikki Tomlinson Franke (Coach Category) 2002

Golf
Patty Berg 1980 
JoAnne Carner 1987 
Charlotte Dod (and tennis, archery) 1986 
 Sandra Haynie 1999 
 Betty Hicks 1995 
 Hisako Higuchi 2008 
 Betty Jameson 1999 
Carol Mann 1982 
Eleanora Sears (and polo, squash) 1984 
Betsy Rawls 1986 
Louise Suggs 1987 
Glenna Collett Vare1981 
 Linda Vollstedt (Coach Category) 2003 
Kathy Whitworth 1984 
Mickey Wright 1981
Mildred "Babe" Didrikson Zaharias (and track and field) 1980

Gymnastics
Věra Čáslavská 1991 
Nadia Comaneci 1990 
Muriel Grossfeld (Coach Category) 1991 
 Ágnes Keleti 2001 
Olga Korbut 1982 
Larissa Latynina 1985 
 Shannon Miller 2008 
 Mary Lou Retton 1993 
Ludmilla Tourischeva 1987

Hockey
 Constance Applebee (Coach Category) 1991

Judo
 Rusty Kanokogi (Coach Category) 1994

Lacrosse
 Tina Sloan Green (Coach Category) 1999

Marathon
 Joan Benoit Samuelson 1999 
 Grete Waitz 1995

Motor racing
 Janet Guthrie 1980

Mountaineering
Marie Marvingt (and aviation) 1987

Orienteering
Annichen Kringstad 1995

Shooting
Margaret Murdock 1988

Skating

Figure skating
Tenley Albright 1983 
 Ludmila Belousova 1992 
 Mabel Fairbanks (Coach Category) 2001 
Peggy Fleming 1981 
 Dorothy Hamill 1998 
Sonja Henie 1982 
 Carol Heiss Jenkins 1992 
Irina Rodnina 1988 
 Barbara Ann Scott-King 1997 
Theresa Weld Blanchard 1989 
 Katarina Witt 2005

Ice dancing
 Jayne Torvill 2002

Speed skating
 Bonnie Blair 2001 
 Dianne Holum (Coach Category) 1996 
 Kit Klein 1993 
 Lydia Skoblikova 1996 
Sheila Young 1981

Skiing

Alpine skiing
Florence Steurer 1972
Crystal Cranz 1991
 Diana Golden Brosnihan 1997 
Andrea Mead Lawrence 1983 
Annemarie Moser-Proell 1982

Water skiing
Willa McGuire Cook 1990

Squash
 Heather McKay 2003 
Eleanora Sears (and golf, polo) 1984

Softball
 Sharron Backus (Coach Category) 1993 
 Sue Enquist (Coach Category) 2008 
Joan Joyce 1989 
 Marjorie Wright (Coach Category) 2005

Swimming
 Shirley Babashoff 2000 
Tracy Caulkins 1986 
 Florence Chadwick 1996 
Ann Curtis 1985 
Gertrude Ederle 1980 
 Kornelia Ender 1993 
 Janet Evans 2001 
Dawn Fraser 1985 
 Shane Gould 2006 
 Nancy Hogshead-Makar 2004 
Eleanor Holm 1980 
 Mary T. Meagher 1993 
Debbie Meyer 1987 
 Diana Nyad 2006 
Donna de Varona 1983

Synchronized Swimming
 Chris Carver (Coach) 2000 
 Gail Emery (Coach) 1997 
 Tracie Ruiz 2000

Tennis
 Maria Esther Bueno 2004 
Maureen Connolly 1987 
Margaret Court 1986 
Charlotte Dod (and golf, archery) 1986 
Chris Evert 1981  
Althea Gibson 1980 
Evonne Goolagong-Cawley 1989 
Billie Jean King 1980
Suzanne Lenglen 1984 
Martina Navratilova 1984 
 Margaret Osborne duPont 1998 
Hazel Wightman 1986

Track and field
 Evelyn Ashford 1997 
Fanny Blankers-Koen 1982 
 Valerie Brisco 2002 
 Hassiba Boulmerka 2008 
 Chi Cheng 1994 
 Alice Coachman 1991 
 Betty Cuthbert 2002 
 Mae Faggs 1996 
 Barbara Jacket (Coach Category) 1995 
Nell Jackson (Coach Category) 1990 
 Marjorie Jackson-Nelson 2000 
 Florence Griffith Joyner 1998 
 Jackie Joyner-Kersee 2003 
 Beverly Kearney (Coach Category) 2004 
 Irena Kirszenstein Szewinska 1992 
Madeline Manning 1987 
 Nawal El Moutawakel 2006
Wilma Rudolph 1980 
Helen Stephens 1983 
 Shirley Strickland 1998 
Wyomia Tyus 1981 
Willye White 1988 
Mildred "Babe" Didrikson Zaharias (and golf) 1980

Volleyball
Flo Hyman 1986

References

Women's halls of fame
Women
Halls of fame in New York (state)
Women in sports